Trym Bergman (born 24 January 1969) is a Norwegian football manager and former midfielder.

Growing up in FK Ørn-Horten, he helped win the Norwegian Junior Cup and the Norway Cup in 1988. He played four seasons with their first team, citing Dag Riisnæs as his most skilled teammate. Ahead of the 1992 season he joined Eliteserien side Kongsvinger, where he amassed 166 league games and 25 cup games throughout the 1999 season.

Ahead of the 2000 season he moved abroad, to Swedish Hammarby. He became league champion in 2001. From 2003 to 2005 he again played in his home county Vestfold, in Sandefjord, before finishing his career in Ørn-Horten.

Ahead of the 2013 season he was announced as one of two "first-team coaches" in Ørn-Horten, together with Cato Kihle, and under head coach Jørgen Jalland. The team lasted for two seasons. In 2017 Bergman returned as assistant coach.

He started coaching the Kongsvinger womens team, after he moved back to Kongsvinger a year prior.

References

1969 births
Living people
Norwegian footballers
People from Horten
FK Ørn-Horten players
Kongsvinger IL Toppfotball players
Hammarby Fotboll players
Sandefjord Fotball players
Eliteserien players
Norwegian First Division players
Allsvenskan players
Norwegian expatriate footballers
Expatriate footballers in Sweden
Norwegian expatriate sportspeople in Sweden
Norwegian football managers
Association football midfielders
Sportspeople from Vestfold og Telemark